Lili is a 1953 musical film starring Leslie Caron and Mel Ferrer.

Lili may also refer to:

People
 Lili (given name), includes a list of people with the name
 Alizée or Lili (born 1984), French singer 
 Lili Iskandar (born 2002), Lebanese footballer

Other uses
 Lilin (singular Lili), legendary demons in Mesopotamian mythology and Hebrew folklore
 Lili (1918 film), a Hungarian film featuring Béla Lugosi
 Lili (feline), the offspring of a liger and a lion
 Lili (Tekken), a character from the Tekken fighting game series
 Lili (opera), an 1882 opéra bouffe by Hervé
 Lili, a fictional fairy in La Corda d'Oro (Kiniro no Corda)
 List of storms named Lili

See also
 Li Li (disambiguation)
 Lille (disambiguation)
 Lilley (disambiguation)
 Lilli (disambiguation)
 Lillie (disambiguation)
 Lilly (disambiguation)
 Lily (disambiguation)